James or Jim Bradshaw may refer to:

 James Bradshaw (1613–1685), English clergyman and ejected minister
 James Bradshaw (actor) (born 1976), British actor
 James Bradshaw (American football), American college football coach, head coach at Fresno State (1936–1942, 1946)
 James Bradshaw (cricketer, born 1902) (1902–1984), English cricketer, played for Leicestershire 1923–33 
 James Bradshaw (cricketer, born 1906) (1906–1938), English cricketer, played for Leicestershire 1935–38
 James Bradshaw (Jacobite) (1717–1746), English Jacobite rebel
 James Bradshaw (minister) (1636–1702), English clergyman and ejected minister
 James Bradshaw (MP, born 1793) (1793–1847), Member of Parliament for Berwick-upon-Tweed, 1835–1837, and Canterbury, 1837–1847
 James Bradshaw (MP for Brackley) (1786–1833), Member of Parliament for Brackley, 1825–1832
 James Benn Bradshaw (1831–1886), New Zealand politician
 James Bradshaw (Jamaican politician), speaker of the House of Assembly of Jamaica in 1694
 Jim Bradshaw (born 1939), American football player
 James Bradshaw of The British Family, family avoiding imported goods in 2013

See also
 Albert James Bradshaw (1882–1956), Canadian politician, businessman and farmer